Brasserie Saint James is a brewpub in Reno, Nevada. The restaurant opened to the public on October 17, 2012 on the site of an old icehouse with its own water supply. Over one hundred emptied wine barrels are kept for maturing their beers.

Awards and Recognitions
In 2014, the Brasserie was named Great American Beer Festival's Mid-Size Brewpub of the Year.

 2013 U.S. Beer Championships Gold Medal "French Biere De Garde" - Red Headed Stranger
 2013 North American Beer Awards Bronze Medal “Bohemian Pilsner" - The Pils 2013 North American Beer Awards Bronze Medal “Belgian Dubbel” - Maquis 6
 2014 U.S. Beer Championships Gold Medal "Belgian Tripel" - The Third Man
 2014 U.S. Beer Championships Silver Medal “Smoked Beer" - Bamberg Rauchbier
 2014 North American Beer Awards Silver Medal “Barrel Aged Beer" - Sophia D'oren
 2014 The United States Beer Tasting Championships Honorable Mention "Barrel Aged Beer" - Sophia D'oren
 2014 The United States Beer Tasting Championships Best of the Rockies-Southwest “Sour Beer" - Sophia D'oren
 2014 The United States Beer Tasting Championships Honorable Mention "Belgian Style Ale" - Quadrophobia
 2014 Great American Beer Festival Gold Medal “French & Belgian Saison" - Daily Wages
 2014 Great American Beer Festival Best Midsize Brewpub - Brasserie Saint James
 2014 Great American Beer Festival Best Midsize Brewpub Brewers - Josh Watterson & Matt Watterson
 2014 The United States Beer Tasting Championships Best of the Rockies-Southwest "Porter" - Jamison's Station
 2015 Best of Craft Beer Awards Gold Medal “French & Belgian Saison" - Daily Wages
 2015 Best of Craft Beer Awards Silver Medal “French Bier De Garde” - Red Headed Stranger
 2015 U.S. Beer Championships Bronze Medal “French/Belgian Ale" - Red Headed Stranger
 2015 U.S. Beer Championships Silver Medal “Belgian Lambic" - Plum Lambic
 2015 LA International Beer Competition Gold Medal “Belgian Style Abbey Ale" - Third Man
 2015 LA International Beer Competition Gold Medal “French and Belgian Saison"- Daily Wages
 2015 LA International Beer Competition Bronze Medal “Dortmunder or German Oktoberfest"-Oktoberfest
 2015 LA International Beer Competition Bronze Medal “Belgian Style Lambic" - Lambic Grand Cru
 2015 LA International Beer Competition Honorable Mention "Experimental Beer" - White Downs
 2015 North American Beer Awards Gold Medal "Other Belgian Style Ales" - 1904
 2015 North American Beer Awards Gold Medal “Lambic" - Lambic Grand Cru
 2015 The United States Beer Tasting Championships Best of the Rockies-Southwest "Fruit Beer" - Plum Lambic
 2015 Great American Beer Festival Silver Medal “French & Belgian Saison" - Daily Wages
 2016 Best of Craft Beer Awards Bronze Medal “Belgian Strong Golden Ale" - Third Man
 2016 Best of Craft Beer Awards Gold Medal “Specialty Wood Aged Beer" - 1904
 2016 LA International Beer Competition Silver Medal “German Style Kolsch” – The Koln Concert
 2016 LA International Beer Competition Bronze Medal “Belgian Style Lambic" - Lambic Grand Cru
 2016 San Diego International Beer Competition Silver Medal “French & Belgian Style Saison" - Daily Wages
 2016 U.S. Beer Championships Gold Medal "Sour/Belgian Lambic" - Lambic Grand Cru
 2016 U.S. Beer Championships Silver Medal “French/Belgian Saison" - Daily Wages
 2016 U.S. Beer Championships Silver Medal “Belgian Style Fruit Beer” – Plum Lambic
 2017 Best of Craft Beer Awards Gold Medal “Belgian and French Saison" - Daily Wages
 2017 Best of Craft Beer Awards Silver Medal "Belgian Style Lambic" - Lambic Grand Cru
 2017 U.S. Beer Championship Gold Medal "Belgian-style Tripel” – Third Man
 2017 U.S. Beer Championship Silver Medal “Brett Beer" - 1904
 2018 Best of Craft Beer Awards Bronze Medal “American Origin Lager Style” - Santiago
 2018 Best of Craft Beer Awards Gold Medal “Belgian Style Lambic" - Lambic Grand Cru
 2018 U.S. Beer Championship Gold Medal “Belgian Quadrupel” - Quadrophobia

Other Accolades 

 Mens Journal top 100 beers 2014 Daily Wages Saison
 Mens Journal top 100 beers 2017 Daily Wages Saison
 UNTAPPED best beer in Nevada 2016 Daily Wages
 Gayout top 12 beers in the world 2015 Red Headed Stranger

Beers

See also

 List of breweries in Nevada

References

American beer brands
Beer brewing companies based in Nevada
Buildings and structures in Reno, Nevada
Companies based in Reno, Nevada
Companies based in Nevada
Culture of Reno, Nevada
Drinking establishments in Nevada
Privately held companies based in Nevada
Restaurants established in 2012
Restaurants in Nevada
Drinking establishments in the San Francisco Bay Area
Restaurants in San Francisco
2016 establishments in California
Tourist attractions in Reno, Nevada